Eduardo Estrada Celis (born 25 January 1995) is a Colombian cyclist, who currently rides for UCI Continental team .

Major results
2011
 1st  Road race, National Junior Road Championships
2014
 1st Team pursuit, Central American and Caribbean Games
2016
 2nd Time trial, National Under-23 Road Championships

References

External links

1995 births
Living people
Colombian male cyclists
Sportspeople from Santander Department
21st-century Colombian people
Competitors at the 2014 Central American and Caribbean Games
Competitors at the 2018 Central American and Caribbean Games